The 37th Massachusetts General Court, consisting of the Massachusetts Senate and the Massachusetts House of Representatives, met in 1816 and 1817 during the governorship of John Brooks. John Phillips served as president of the Senate and Timothy Bigelow served as speaker of the House.

Senators

Representatives

See also
 14th United States Congress
 15th United States Congress
 List of Massachusetts General Courts

References

External links
 . (Includes data for state senate and house elections in 1816)
 
 
 

Political history of Massachusetts
Massachusetts legislative sessions
massachusetts
1816 in Massachusetts
massachusetts
1817 in Massachusetts